Son of Blagger, the sequel to Blagger, is a scrolling platform game created by Tony Crowther and released by Alligata for the Commodore 64 computer in 1983. A ZX Spectrum port by Elliot Gay and a BBC Micro port were released in 1984.

Legacy
A clone of Son of Blagger was released for Amiga, titled Jonas Fulstrand. The game was released on a PD-Soft disk as Son of Blagger.

References

External links

1983 video games
Alligata games
BBC Micro and Acorn Electron games
Commodore 64 games
Platform games
Single-player video games
Video game sequels
Video games developed in the United Kingdom
ZX Spectrum games